Kaththi is a 2014 Indian Tamil-language action film written and directed by AR Murugadoss. The film stars Vijay and Samantha Ruth Prabhu while Sathish, Neil Nitin Mukesh and Tota Roy Chowdhury play supporting roles. The film focuses on the attempts made by a petty thief Kathiresan (Vijay), the look-alike of a jailed hydrology graduate Jeevanandham (Vijay), to lead a rebellion by farmers from the latter's village, Thanoothu. Kathiresan helps them fight against Chirag (Mukesh), the owner of a soft drink company who has exploited Thanoothu's water resources for his own profit. Produced by Allirajah Subaskaran and K. Karunamoorthy under their production company Lyca Productions, the soundtrack and score were composed by Anirudh Ravichander. George C. Williams and A. Sreekar Prasad were in charge of the cinematography and editing respectively.

Produced on a budget of ₹700 million, Kaththi was released on 22 October 2014 to critical acclaim. It was commercially successful, grossing ₹1.3 billion worldwide. The film won 14 awards from 33 nominations; its direction, story, screenplay, performances of the cast members, music, choreography and stunt direction have received the most attention from award groups.

At the 62nd Filmfare Awards South, Kaththi was nominated in eight categories, including Best Actor (Vijay), Best Actress (Samantha) and Best Music Director (Ravichander); it won for Best Film (Subaskaran and Karunamoorthy), Best Director (Murugadoss) and Best Dance Choreographer (Shobi Paulraj). The film received ten nominations at the 9th Vijay Awards, and won two, Favourite Film and Favourite Director. It garnered seven nominations at the 4th South Indian International Movie Awards ceremony and won four awards, including Best Film, Best Actor in a Negative Role for Mukesh, Best Fight Choreographer for Anal Arasu and Best Dance Choreographer for Shobi. Kaththi won the Best Music Director for Ravichander at the 1st IIFA Utsavam while also being nominated for Best Director and Best Female Playback Singer (Sunidhi Chauhan). Among other wins, the film received three Edison Awards and one Ananda Vikatan Cinema Awards. It also received a nomination for Best Social Awareness at the Norway Tamil Film Festival Awards, but it lost to Sigaram Thodu (2014).

Awards and nominations

See also 
 List of Tamil films of 2014

Notes

References

External links 
 Accolades for Kaththi at the Internet Movie Database

Kaththi